Colossendeis is a genus  of sea spider (class Pycnogonida) belonging to the family Colossendeidae.

These sea spiders can be found in deep-sea.

The genus contains bioluminescent species.

Species

 Colossendeis acuta Stiboy-Risch, 1993
 Colossendeis adelpha Child, 1998
 Colossendeis angusta Sars, 1877
 Colossendeis aperta Turpaeva, 2005
 Colossendeis arcanus Turpaeva, 2008
 Colossendeis arcuata A. Milne-Edwards, 1885
 Colossendeis australis Hodgson, 1907
 Colossendeis avidus Pushkin, 1970
 Colossendeis belekurovi Pushkin, 1993
 Colossendeis bicincta Schimkewitsch, 1893
 Colossendeis brevirostris Child, 1995
 Colossendeis bruuni Fage, 1956
 Colossendeis clavata Meinert, 1899
 Colossendeis colossea Wilson, 1881
 Colossendeis concedis Child, 1995
 Colossendeis cucurbita Cole, 1909
 Colossendeis curtirostris Stock, 1963
 Colossendeis dalli Child, 1995
 Colossendeis drakei Calman, 1915
 Colossendeis elephantis Child, 1995
 Colossendeis enigmatica Turpaeva, 1974
 Colossendeis ensifer Child, 1995
 Colossendeis fijigrypos Bamber, 2004
 Colossendeis fragilis Pushkin, 1993
 Colossendeis gardineri Carpenter, 1907
 Colossendeis geoffroyi Mane-Garzon, 1944
 Colossendeis glacialis Hodgson, 1907
 Colossendeis gracilis Hoek, 1881
 Colossendeis grassus Pushkin, 1993
 Colossendeis hoeki Gordon, 1944
 Colossendeis insolitus Pushkin, 1993
 Colossendeis korotkevitschi Pushkin, 1984
 Colossendeis kurtchatovi Turpaeva, 1993
 Colossendeis leniensis Pushkin, 1993
 Colossendeis leptorhynchus Hoek, 1881
 Colossendeis longirostris Gordon, 1938
 Colossendeis losinskii Turpaeva, 2002
 Colossendeis macerrima Wilson, 1881
 Colossendeis media Hoek, 1881
 Colossendeis megalonyx Hoek, 1881
 Colossendeis melancholicus Stock, 1975
 Colossendeis mica Pushkin, 1970
 Colossendeis microsetosa Hilton, 1943
 Colossendeis minor Schimkewitsch, 1893
 Colossendeis minuta Hoek, 1881
 Colossendeis mycterismos Bamber, 2004
 Colossendeis nasuta Hedgpeth, 1949
 Colossendeis notialis Child, 1995
 Colossendeis oculifera Stock, 1963
 Colossendeis peloria Child, 1994
 Colossendeis perforata Turpaeva, 1993
 Colossendeis pipetta Stock, 1991
 Colossendeis potentis Turpaeva, 2008
 Colossendeis proboscidea (Sabine, 1824)
 Colossendeis pseudochelata Pushkin, 1993
 Colossendeis robusta Hoek, 1881
 Colossendeis rostrata Turpaeva, 1994
 Colossendeis scoresbii Gordon, 1932
 Colossendeis scotti Calman, 1915
 Colossendeis sinuosa Stock, 1997
 Colossendeis spicula Child, 1994
 Colossendeis stramenti Fry & Hedgpeth, 1969
 Colossendeis subminuta Schimkewitsch, 1893
 Colossendeis tasmanica Staples, 2007
 Colossendeis tenera Hilton, 1943
 Colossendeis tenuipedis Pushkin, 1993
 Colossendeis tethya Turpaeva, 1974
 Colossendeis tortipalpis Gordon, 1932
 Colossendeis vityazi Turpaeva, 1973
 Colossendeis weddellensis Turpaeva, 2008
 Colossendeis wilsoni Calman, 1915

References

 Manfred Moritz: Ordnung Colossendeomorpha in: Urania Tierreich. Wirbellose Tiere 2. Urania-Verlag, Berlin 2000; Seite 327. .
 Tomás Munilla, Anna Soler Membrives: Check-list of the pycnogonids from Antarctic and sub-Antarctic waters: zoogeographic implications. Antarctic Science (2008) 1-13

Pycnogonids
Bioluminescent arthropoda